The Federal Cedar is a bulk carrier ship. She was built in 2016 by Oshima Shipbuilding and is registered in the Marshall Islands.

References

External links 
The Federal Cedar on Welland Canal.

Cargo ships
Ships of the Marshall Islands
2016 ships
Ships built by Oshima Shipbuilding